Changsha Economic and Technological Development Zone (CETZ) is an economic and technical development zone at state level in Changsha, Hunan, China. The zone was established in August 1992, its old name was Xingsha Development Zone of Changsha, changed to the present name on 29 March, 1994. CETZ was upgraded to an economic and technical development zone  at state-level in February, 2000. The headquarters for CETZ is situated in Xingsha in the eastern suburb of Changsha,

The zone attracts many foreign investments, such as Mitsubishi Motor, NEC, Bosch, Philips, LG, HEG, Coca-Cola and Pepsi. Major industries in the zone include machinery processing and manufacturing, electronics and information, building materials, food and beverage, and printing.

Link
Changsha Economic and Technological Development Zone

References

Changsha County
Economy of Changsha
1992 establishments in China
Special Economic Zones of China